Eli Goodman (born July 12, 1971) is an American film and television actor, active since 1997. He has appeared in more than 25 film and television series. He studied toward a BFA in acting at The Theatre School at DePaul University.

Filmography

Film

Television

References

External links
 

1971 births
Living people
Actors from Santa Fe, New Mexico
American male film actors
American male television actors